Lopidea is a genus of plant bugs in the family Miridae. There are more than 90 described species in Lopidea.

Species
These 93 species belong to the genus Lopidea:

 Lopidea albicostata Knight & Schaffner, 1968
 Lopidea ampla Van Duzee, 1917
 Lopidea anisacanthi Knight, 1962
 Lopidea apache Knight, 1918
 Lopidea arizonae Knight, 1918
 Lopidea austrina Knight & Schaffner, 1975
 Lopidea balli Knight, 1923
 Lopidea barberi Knight, 1962
 Lopidea bellula Distant, 1883
 Lopidea bicolor Distant, 1893
 Lopidea bifurca Van Duzee, 1921
 Lopidea bispinosa Knight, 1965
 Lopidea bonanza Asquith, 1991
 Lopidea bullata Knight, 1923
 Lopidea caesar (Reuter, 1876)
 Lopidea chandleri Moore, 1956
 Lopidea chiapasi Knight & Schaffner, 1968
 Lopidea confluenta (Say, 1832)
 Lopidea confraterna (Gibson, 1918)
 Lopidea cuneata Van Duzee, 1910
 Lopidea dakota Knight, 1923
 Lopidea davisi Knight, 1917
 Lopidea dawsoni Knight, 1965
 Lopidea desertina Knight & Schaffner, 1972
 Lopidea eremita Van Duzee, 1921
 Lopidea falcata Knight, 1923
 Lopidea falcicula Knight, 1923
 Lopidea fuscosa Knight, 1968
 Lopidea gainesi Knight, 1918
 Lopidea garryae Knight, 1918
 Lopidea gemina Knight & Schaffner, 1972
 Lopidea guatemalana Knight & Schaffner, 1975
 Lopidea heidemanni Knight, 1917
 Lopidea hesperus (Kirkaldy, 1902)
 Lopidea igualae Knight & Schaffner, 1968
 Lopidea incurva Knight, 1918
 Lopidea indigena Knight & Schaffner, 1972
 Lopidea instabilis (Reuter, 1909)
 Lopidea intermedia Knight, 1918
 Lopidea jalpani Knight & Schaffner, 1972
 Lopidea jaurezi Knight & Schaffner, 1972
 Lopidea juarezi Knight
 Lopidea knighti T.Henry, 1985
 Lopidea lateralis Knight, 1918
 Lopidea lathyri Knight, 1923
 Lopidea lutea Knight, 1965
 Lopidea luteola Knight & Schaffner, 1968
 Lopidea major Knight, 1918 (Red Mountain laurel mirid)
 Lopidea marginalis (Reuter, 1909)
 Lopidea marginanda (Distant, 1883)
 Lopidea marginata Uhler, 1894
 Lopidea media (Say, 1832)
 Lopidea mexicana Distant, 1893
 Lopidea meyeri Knight & Schaffner, 1968
 Lopidea miniata Knight & Schaffner, 1975
 Lopidea minima Knight, 1918
 Lopidea minor Knight, 1918
 Lopidea mixteca Knight & Schaffner, 1972
 Lopidea mohave Knight, 1923
 Lopidea mucronata Knight, 1965
 Lopidea murrayi Knight & Schaffner, 1975
 Lopidea nicholella Knight, 1965
 Lopidea nicholi Knight, 1923
 Lopidea nigridia Uhler, 1895
 Lopidea oaxacana Knight & Schaffner, 1975
 Lopidea pacifica Knight & Schaffner, 1975
 Lopidea parva (Distant, 1883)
 Lopidea parvula Knight & Schaffner, 1972
 Lopidea picta Knight, 1918
 Lopidea pteleae Knight & Schaffner, 1968
 Lopidea pueblana Knight & Schaffner, 1975
 Lopidea puella Van Duzee, 1921
 Lopidea robiniae (Uhler, 1861)
 Lopidea robusta (Uhler, 1894)
 Lopidea rostrata Knight, 1965
 Lopidea salicis Knight, 1917
 Lopidea sayi Knight, 1918
 Lopidea schaffneri Knight, 1965
 Lopidea scitula (Walker, 1873)
 Lopidea scutata Knight, 1962
 Lopidea setosa Knight & Schaffner, 1968
 Lopidea splendida Knight & Schaffner, 1975
 Lopidea staphyleae Knight, 1917
 Lopidea subperiscopa Knight & Schaffner, 1968
 Lopidea taurina Van Duzee, 1921
 Lopidea tehuacana Knight & Schaffner, 1975
 Lopidea teton Knight, 1923
 Lopidea tolteci Knight & Schaffner, 1972
 Lopidea tridigitata Knight, 1965
 Lopidea ute Knight, 1923
 Lopidea wileyae Knight, 1923
 Lopidea wileyi Knight, 1923
 Lopidea zapoteci Knight & Schaffner, 1972

References

Further reading

External links

 

Orthotylini
Articles created by Qbugbot